(also , , , literally 'Palug's cat') was a monstrous cat in Welsh legend, given birth in  by the pig Henwen of Cornwall; the cat was later to haunt the Isle of Anglesey, and was said to have killed 180 warriors when Sir Kay went to the island to hunt it down.

Vicious poems were composed by Frenchmen claiming it killed King Arthur, according to a 12th-century Anglo-Norman author.

Etymology
The name  may mean "scratching cat", but this is just one of a range of possible meanings. The word  is theorized to have a common  stem, which may mean: 'hit, strike', 'cut, lop', 'scratch, claw', or even 'dig, pierce'.

Aquatic nature

It was a sort of fish-cat which was the killer of King Arthur (and thus analogous to the ) in a fragmentary German poem (§Manuel und Amande). The monstrous cat of Lausanne, which was the analogue in the Vulgate Merlin started out as a black kitten caught by a fisherman in his net.

The Cath Palug is always localised nearby water ; lake of Bourget and Lake of Geneva in France, the sea in Wales (See §Localisation).

Welsh sources 
 is mentioned in just two works among early Welsh sources, the triads and a fragmentary poem.

Triads
's birth origins are given in "The Powerful Swineherds" in the Welsh Triads (end of the 13th century).

In the encounter, nine score (180) warriors were killed by the cat.

The fragmentary poem states that Kay's shield is  against the cat, which has been construed in various ways, but plausibly interpreted as "polished against Palug's cat". This description coincides with the Middle English story in the Lambeth manuscript, in which Arthur raises a shield (presumably mirrored) causing the cats to attack their own shadows reflected in it.

Arthur's fight with the cat 
Outside of Wales, the cat's opponent has been transposed to King Arthur himself.

The  is the equivalent monster in Old French and Anglo-Norman sources.

Sometimes the beast wins, sometimes King Arthur wins.

Some of the works only speak of an anonymous cat or cats, but are considered examples of chapalu encounters by commentators, due to the parallels. The cat of Lausanne (Losan) that fought Arthur, in the Vulgate cycle is a notable example of the cat not being named.

The king is the victor in the Vulgate prose Merlin and in a Middle-English romance in the Lambert ms. noted above. His defeat is noted in several romances that are essentially non-Arthurian, but can be viewed as a French joke against the English, although some researchers believed some genuine tradition of an alternative death of Arthur.

In the early 13th century, the Anglo-Norman poet André de Coutance rebuked the French for having written a vindictive poem (or poems) describing King Arthur's death by a cat. André indignantly added that this was an utter lie.

This passage in André's work  ("The Romance of the French") has been excerpted and commented in various studies. André's short résumé of the French work was that Chapalu kicked Arthur into a bog, afterwards killed Arthur, swam to England and became king in his place.

A French original is thought to have existed to the fragmentary, Middle German poem  written between 1170 and the beginning of the 13th century. It implies that slain by a sort of a "fish-cat", or strictly according to the text, it was a fish which at the same time "had the form of a cat". This was considered to be a work in the same tradition as the French works that told of Arthur's dishonorable demise, such as polemicized against by André the Norman.

Vulgate Merlin
 ("The story of Merlin", written in the 13th century). A man fishing in the lake of Lausanne swears that he will dedicate to God the first creature that he catches, but fails to keep his oath. At the third cast of his line he catches a black kitten, which he takes home, only for it to grow to gigantic proportions. The giant cat then kills the fisherman, his entire family, and subsequently any traveller unwise enough to come near the lake. It is, however, finally killed by King Arthur.

("Galeran of Brittany", written in the 13th century) is another work that refers to Arthur's combat with the cat.

There is some issue of dissent regarding this interpretation. The text can be read in the converse, so that the German knight says Arthur had killed the cat. Freymond noted that while this was grammatically possible, it was not an allowable interpretation in the context. Gaston Paris agreed on this point. However, John Beston (2008) translated the portion at issue as "the proverb about King Arthur killing the cat".

Spanish chivalric romance

Other heroes
The chapalu is encountered by heroes from the Charlemagne cycle, in either late interpolations or later prose sequels to the original .

The epic originally written  did not contain the episode, but a late-13th century interpolation to it introduced Arthurian elements.

An extract containing the  portion was published by Antoine Le Roux de Lincy in 1836, Paulin Paris wrote summaries based on a different manuscript.

Chapalu here was the son born after the  Gringalet raped the fée Brunehold while she bathed in the fountain of Oricon. Although  was beautiful, his mother could not bear her shame and turned him into a hideously shaped monster, and this curse could only be lifted when he has sucked a few drops of Rainouart's blood.

The description of the  after his metamorphosis was that he had a cat's head with red eyes, a horse's body, a griffon's talons (or dragon's feet), and a lion's tail.

Rainouart is then brought to Avalon by three fées, and Arthur the king of Avalon commands Chapalu to fight this newcomer. In the ensuing battle, Chapalu laps some blood from his opponent's heel, and his human form is restored.

Ogier
 / Ogier the Dane., Probably inspired by The battle of Loquifer. When it is vanquished in battle the  becomes a human called  ('blessed').

Representation
The crown on Arthur and the horns on the mounting beast appear to be artefacts of the restorer, based on preserved drawings of the mosaic from earlier.

Localisation

The community still retained vestigial lore of encounters with the monstrous cat, though Arthur did not figure in them. There was also a piece of 13th century writing by Etienne de Bourbon saying that King Arthur carried out a hunt at Mont du chat.

The Welsh tradition gives as localisation the Isle of Anglesey but born at Llanveir.

In popular culture
 In the Pendragon module "Savage Mountains" (1991) there is an adventure called "The Adventure of the Paulag Cat".
 In  by Nakaba Suzuki, Cath is a monstrous creature born from the Mother of Chaos who poses as King Arthur Pendragon's companion.
In the Art of the Adept Series by Michael G, Manning, called (Cath Bawlg aka  'that goddamned cat") is a demigod feared by the Fae and helps the main character destroy sorcerers.
Chris Torrance's poetry collection The Diary of Palug's Cat uses the Arthurian story as an allegory for a doomed love affair.
 Kyouyama Kazusa from the mobile-game Blue Archive was once given the nickname of the "Cath Palug".

Explanatory notes

References

Citations

Bibliography

Primary sources

Triads

What man is the Porter? 
 ; II pp. 50–53 Pa gur ẏv ẏ portarthur (Welsh), pp. 350–351 (notes)



; "Appendix 5: extrait du roman de Guillaume au Court Nez, ms. du Roy, n° 23 Laval, tome II"



Vulgate Merlin continuation /

Middle English prose Merlin 
(text)I  (Introduction)

Middle English romance in Lambeth ms

Secondary sources 

 
 
  
 

  
  

Arthurian characters
Fictional cats
Mythological felines
Welsh mythology
Welsh legendary creatures
Cat folklore